Linux Foundation Energy (known as LF Energy) is an initiative launched by the US-based Linux Foundation in 2018 to improve the power grid. Its aim is to spur the uptake of digital technologies within the electricity sector and adjoining sectors using open source software and practices, with a key application being the smarter grid.

LF Energy launched SOGNO software initially funded by the European Commission Horizon 2093 programs.

History
LF Energy was formed in 2018. The organization was founded by Shuli Goodman, who serves as its executive director. RTE supported the creation of LF Energy since early 2018 and became its first Strategic Member. LF Energy is an umbrella organization that includes energy companies such as Alliander and RTE. Energy company executives such as Arjan Stam (Director of System Operations at Alliander) and Lucian Balea (Director of Open Source) have joined LF Energy as governing board members. LF Energy helped develop Alliander's open source program offices after Alliander joined the organization in 2019.

The organization formally launched in May 2019.

LF Energy launched the open industrial IoT platform GXF (Grid eXchange Fabric) in collaboration with Alliander in February 2020.

LF Energy partnered with GE Renewable Energy, Schneider Electric, National Grid, and RTE (Réseau de Transport d'Électricité) to launch the Digital Substation Automation Systems (DSAS) initiative and the related Configuration Modules for Power Industry Automation Systems (CoMPAS) project in 2020. The DSAS initiative aims to use open-source technology to convert electrical substations into digital substations to accelerate progress towards achieving carbon neutrality. In like manner, CoMPAS provided software modules for automation systems in the power industry.

In 2020, LF Energy launched the second DSAS open-source project SEAPATH, which provided a platform for virtualized automation for power grids and substations.

In 2021, LF Energy collaborated with Sony Computer Science Laboratory on the microgrid initiative Hyphae, which aims to automate peer-to-peer renewable energy distribution. The organization also introduced the SOGNO software initially funded by the European Commission Horizon 2020 programs. Its focus is on grid automation using microservices and control rooms.

Microsoft partnered with LF Energy as part of its 100/100/0 program in September 2021.

Google joined LF Energy as a Strategic Member as part of its 24/7 Carbon Free Energy initiative in early 2022.

In early 2022, LF Energy launched the EVerest project, which aims to provide open source software for the electric vehicle charging infrastructure. LF Energy was also one of the organizations that took part in the Carbon Call, an initiative aimed at developing reliable measurement and accounting of carbon emissions.

Governing board 

 Lucan Balea (Strategic Member Representative & Board Chair)
 Arjan Stam (Strategic Member Representative & Board Treasurer)
 Antonello Monti (Technical Advisory Council Chair)
 Maud Texier (Strategic Member Representative - Google)
 Audrey Lee (Strategic Member Representative - Microsoft)
 Marissa Hammond (General Member Representative - Utilidata)
 McGee Young (General Member Representative - WattCarbon)

References

External links

Linux Foundation
Electric power infrastructure in the United States
Energy organizations
501(c)(6) nonprofit organizations